The G. Fred DiBona Jr. Building, formerly known as the Blue Cross-Blue Shield Tower or IBX Tower, is a skyscraper in  Philadelphia, Pennsylvania housing the headquarters of Independence Blue Cross (the Blue Cross-Blue Shield affiliated organization in the five-county Philadelphia area).  The tower, built between 1988 and 1990, was designed by WZMH Architects, who also designed the CN Tower in Toronto, Ontario, Canada. It was renamed in 2005 after the company's president and CEO, who died of a brain tumor.

Construction of the building consists of a steel skeleton surrounding a reinforced concrete core, similar to the construction of the new Comcast Center. The exterior is all blue glass except for granite accents at the base on the eastern and western facades and granite columns at the main entrance. It is currently the eighth-tallest building in Philadelphia.

The building was originally intended to have a twin tower just to its west but the office-space requirements of the company ultimately ended plans for it. That lot remained vacant until an apartment building  was built on it around 2015–2016.

Alain Robert, the famous "French Spider-Man", scaled the building to the 44th floor in 1997, two years after the back-lit Blue Cross logo was added to the building's pediment.

See also

 List of tallest buildings in Philadelphia

References
 Emporis - G. Fred DiBona, Jr. Building

External links
 PhillySkyline.com Blue Cross Tower Site
 Independence Blue Cross

Skyscraper office buildings in Philadelphia
Office buildings completed in 1990
Insurance company headquarters in the United States
WZMH Architects buildings
Postmodern architecture in Pennsylvania
Center City, Philadelphia